Toquegua may be the name of a group of people, and a language, spoken along the Atlantic coast of Guatemala  and Honduras from the area around the mouth of the Golfo Dulce to the Ulua river in Honduras.  It is also an elite indigenous family surname in colonial Honduras, and a place name in the Motagua river valley in 1536.  Feldman (1975), largely based on unpublished notes of Nicholas Helmuth conserved in the American Philosophical Society, concludes that Toquegua is a Chʼol Mayan-related language.  Sheptak (2007) contests that identification and concludes the people referred to as the Toquegua were multi-lingual, speaking Yucatec, Chʼol, Nahuatl, and Lenca.

The Toquegua were merchants of cacao and feathers (particularly quetzal feathers) in the sixteenth century and hosted Yucatec Maya people in their communities.

References 
 Feldman, Lawrence H. (1975), Riverine Maya.  The Toquegua and other Chols of the Lower Motagua.  Museum Brief 15.  University of Missouri, Columbia.
 Feldman, Lawrence H. (1998), Motagua Colonial.  C&M Online Media, Inc., Raleigh North Carolina.
 Sheptak, Russell N. (2007) "Los Toqueguas de la costa Norte de Honduras en la época colonial". Yaxkin 13(2): 140–157.

Mayan languages
Indigenous languages of Central America
Mesoamerican languages
Languages of Guatemala
Former indigenous peoples in Guatemala